Niederndorf is the name of following places:

 Niederndorf (Austria), Kufstein District, Austria
 Niederndorf (Freudenberg), Freudenberg, Westphalia, Germany

See also
 Niederdorf (disambiguation)
 Niederndorferberg, Tyrol, Austria